The 1969 World Table Tennis Championships women's doubles was the 29th edition of the women's doubles championship.
Svetlana Grinberg and Zoja Rudnova defeated Maria Alexandru and Eleonora Mihalca in the final by three sets to two.

Results

See also
 List of World Table Tennis Championships medalists

References

-
1969 in women's table tennis
Table